Truck bedliner, or simply Bedliner, is a protector applied or installed into a truck bed. It can be used to protect the bed of the truck from impact and abrasive damage. There are two broad classifications of bedliners: "Drop-in" and "Spray-on/in". "Drop-in" bedliners are installed into a truck bed with limited preparation work, and are removable for cleaning. Spray-in bedliners require specific preparation to allow the coating to adhere correctly to the bed. How well the coating adheres will determine how long it will last.

History
Protecting the bed of trucks has been around since the inception of the modern pick-up truck in the early 1950s with simple modifications being made such as installing planks of wood to the beds. Ford's F100 series featured such options, now done only for cosmetic purposes or restoration. People have also been known to install a simple sheet of wood as a means to protect the floor from being scratched or dented.

As pick-up trucks were designed to haul cargo, a more advanced method was created. Thermoforming, a technique that has been around since the 1940s in acrylics and styrene, would eventually through advances in development and research create the first plastic drop-in bedliner.  In 1972, G. Fred Lorenzen filed a patent for "protective inner liner of cargo box or body of pickup truck". In 1976, Robert J. Zeffero filed a patent regarding the protection of truck beds with a "cargo box liner for pick-up trucks".  In 1983, Penda Corporation along with others would soon figure out a way to replicate the design and start to manufacture their own design of a bed liner.

Drop-in bedliners
Drop-in or plastic bedliners are the most commonly found type, although with the spray-on bedliner industry garnered recognition, drop-ins have lost some value in market share. Drop-ins can usually be installed rather quickly with no major modification made to the bed of the truck except drilling small holes in key areas to hold it in place in certain applications. Typically made of a polyethylene composite, drop-ins are a rigid structure formed to the contours of a specific vehicle model.  A newer version of a drop-in bedliner, recently introduced, is composed of separate sides and a rubber mat for the floor made by DualLiner.

Spray-on bedliners
"Sprayed-on","Sprayed-in","Spray-on", "Spray-in" (these terms are used interchangeably in the industry) come in varying formulations and process methods such as high or low pressure, aromatic or aliphatic, polyurea or polyurethane, or hybrid and solvent base. Performance greatly relies on the initial surface preparation done on the bed. It is possible to have the color of the bedliner match that of the vehicle, but with time, color fade from ultraviolet radiation is inevitable.

Aromatic is generally used for black and darker colors, and is the least expensive option.

Aliphatic can be a better option for colors because its color is more stable over time in ultraviolet light. It is produced with pure polyurethane, which drives up the cost approximately 35%. Aliphatic materials can be sprayed in a wide variety of colors, including metallic finishes.

Spray-on bedliners can be applied by roller, low pressure, cartridge driven by an air compressor or high pressure machine.

Environmental conditions such as humidity, temperature, wind, and elevation can affect the cure process of a spray-in bedliner. Nozzle aperture, thinners, and spray pressure can be modified to allow proper distribution of the spray lining chemicals.

Differences in spray-on bedliners

Spray-on bedliner material can vary in texture as well as color. Texture can be smooth for easy cleaning or rough to prevent skidding.

Polyurethane can be sprayed from 1/16 inch to 1/4 inches, depending on the application. Thinner coatings may cost less but can chip and crack. Thicker coatings will alter the shape and size of the truck bed somewhat. For trucks with the most rugged use, ArmorThane sets optimum thickness for bedliners as 1/4 inch on the bed and wheel wells and 1/8 inch on the sides. 

When applied correctly, the value of a truck bedliner is that it resists denting, scratching, and holds shape firmly, yet is flexible enough to not crack when navigating through rough terrain. Unlike a metal bed, it absorbs vibration to protect cargo. Whereas painted metal will chip and rust under rough conditions, polyurethane coatings prevent damage from scratching and from most chemicals, and therefore avoid rusting.

Spray on truck bedliners require a professional applicator who has the training and experience to follow the process and deliver a smooth, even surface. The process requires sanding to create a surface for the polyurethane to attach. This allows the polyurethane to bond permanently so it will not bubble even in extreme weather.

The choice of colors is virtually unlimited. A color matching system sprays to OEM specs or owners can choose custom colors.  Adding an ultraviolet stabilizer maintains the appearance even in prolonged direct sunlight.

Spray-on bedliner material for other uses

These spray-on polyurethane coatings are not just for truck bedliners.  They also protect fenders, bumpers, floor boards, nerf bars and trim.  In fact, whole vehicles have been sprayed. The same polyurethane spray can be applied to emergency vehicles, commercial transport, heavy construction, agriculture equipment and boats.

Spraying polyurethane serves two purposes. First, it adds years of service by preventing scratching, rusting, and chemical contamination from deteriorating standard OEM paint.  Second, it can create a roughed up, anti-skid or anti-slip surface.

Some polyurea coatings, using a similar spray system, have been applied to military and private vehicles for blast mitigation.

The MythBusters tested myths about the toughness of spray-on truck bedliner resin in 2011 and confirmed it to be an adequate protection against dents in minor crashes (applied on a car), dog bites (applied on a jacket) and explosive blasts (applied on a wooden or brick wall).

Polyurethane spray bedliners
The bedliner industry has created confusion with regard to all the custom polyurea, polyurethane and polyurea formulations.  Each company boasts of its superior durability and profitable dealer opportunities.  The reality is that they are all very similar, barring low-quality do-it-yourself products.  If you want to learn about the differences between spray bedliners, it is important to understand the differences between polyurethane and polyurea, as well as what is required to achieve different textures and physical properties.  Polyureas and polyurethanes have significant differences chemically, but act similarly in many applications.  For the purpose of bedliners, the big difference is in the application process and the level of isocyanates and VOCs.  This is an important aspect of the bedliner industry, as the presence of VOCs and isocyanates prevents the application of spray bedliners in many states, or places restrictions on how the material can be applied.

Other applications
Only two types of coatings are mentioned so far but additives can be added to coatings to provide different characteristics,  Although this is about Truck Bedliners, the protective coatings can be applied in many other environments have a variety of needs and purposes besides a simple truck bedliner.

In recent years it has become more popular to use bedliner to coat the exterior of vehicles as well. This trend is, among other things, due to an increased availability and greater variety of colors offered. Due to the waterproof and anti-corrosive nature of these polyurethane blends, they are also used as a coating for the interior of boats

HMW/UHMW Medium to heavy duty poly dump bedliners

Super heavy duty UHMW asphalt liner

The “most versatile” dump bedliner can handle hot asphalt one day and rock/concrete the next, maximizing the usage of your dump equipment and lowering maintenance costs.

Heavy duty UHMW liner

“Heavy Duty” dump body bedliners allow for low scope dumping, less sticking and freezing while protecting the bed from heavy, abrasive loads in steel and aluminum dump bodies and trailers.

Origin of the polyurethane liner

It was created in 1983, by American Made Liner Systems, now a division of American Made Systems, Inc.

Purpose of the original dump bedliner

 Permanent protection for dump bodies
 Lower scope dumping reduces chances of roll-over
 Less sticking and freezing of loads
 Higher profits with less carry-backs and more hauls per day

References

Trucks